Martin Popoff (born April 28, 1963) is a Canadian music journalist, critic and author. He is mainly known for writing about the genre of heavy metal music. The senior editor and co-founder of Brave Words & Bloody Knuckles, he has additionally written over twenty books that both critically evaluate heavy metal and document its history. He has been called "heavy metal's most widely recognized journalist" by his publisher. Popoff lives in Toronto, Ontario.

Career
Born in Castlegar, British Columbia, Popoff's interest in heavy metal began as a youth in Trail, British Columbia, in the early 1970s, when bands such as Led Zeppelin and Iron Butterfly were in the collections of the older brothers and cousins of Popoff and his friends. Black Sabbath played even heavier music, and became the group his circle of friends thought of as "our band, not the domain of our elders". Other heavy rock albums of the era, such as Nazareth's Razamanaz and Kiss' Hotter than Hell, further shaped his emerging musical tastes. Angel City and April Wine were among Popoff's favourite bands as a teenager.

Of popular music magazines around at the time, Popoff recalls being a regular reader of Circus, Hit Parader, and later, "Kerrang! blew our minds." He does not identify any specific writers as being particularly influential on his own writing style, saying "it never registered who wrote what."

Popoff received a BA in English from the University of Victoria in 1984 and an MBA in marketing at McMaster University in 1987, working for Xerox before co-owning a print brokering company. For a while in the 1980s, he also played drums in a bar band called Torque. In 1993, he released his first book, the independently published Riff Kills Man!: 25 Years of Recorded Hard Rock and Heavy Metal, a collection of 1,942 critical reviews of heavy metal records. Shortly after its publication, he co-founded Brave Words & Bloody Knuckles, which released its first issue in 1994. He soon returned to his reviews book, releasing a revised and expanded version in 1997 titled The Collector's Guide to Heavy Metal, which almost doubled the original book's number of reviews to 3,700. In the book, he identifies three major stages in the early development of heavy metal. The first stage, "invention", took place in 1970 with the release of Deep Purple in Rock coinciding with debut albums from Black Sabbath and Uriah Heep. Stage two, "re-invention", occurred in 1976 with Judas Priest's Sad Wings of Destiny. The third stage, "re-intensification", happened in 1984 with the release of Metallica's Ride the Lightning.

In the 2000s Popoff revised and expanded his Collector's Guide one more time, splitting it up by decade into three separate volumes comprising a total of 6,763 albums spanning three decades of heavy metal. Volume 3: The Nineties was published in 2007.

Popoff has stated that he considers the greatest record of all time to be Led Zeppelin's Physical Graffiti, followed by Black Sabbath's Sabotage. He has also named Queen's self-titled debut as his personal favourite record of all time, and often regards Max Webster as his all-time favourite band. Newer groups that Popoff has spoken highly of include Mastodon, Opeth, Lamb of God and Dark Tranquillity. His Collector's Guide became rather notorious in some circles of rock fans for a particularly scathing review of Def Leppard's worldwide smash hit glam metal album Hysteria, to which he awarded a score of zero out of ten. Popoff continues to defend his opinion of it years later, citing "just awful production, lyrics, singing, clichés of every musical and lyrical sort."

A number of Popoff's other books are biographies of notable metal bands, including Black Sabbath in Doom Let Loose and Dio in Light Beyond the Black. While the biographies are usually not officially authorized, a large amount of research consists of interviews between Popoff and members of each band. Popoff has said of his relationship with his subjects: "I censor myself because I don't want to write something to hurt people. You write a book on Sabbath and you don’t want to write something to hurt (their) families - I love those guys." A Judas Priest biography, Heavy Metal Painkillers, was published in 2007.

In 2014, Popoff stated that he is working on a new book, entitled Who Invented Heavy Metal? In March 2015, Popoff told Metal Shock Finland's chief editor Mohsen Fayyazi that he had finished writing the book and it will be published in approximately a month's time.

Popoff is a reviewer for BangerTV and also appears frequently on the many shows featured on the YouTube channel of music publication Sea of Tranquility.

Partial bibliography

Collector's Guide series
 20th Century Rock and Roll: Heavy Metal. Burlington: Collector's Guide Publishing. 2000. .
 Southern Rock Review. Burlington: Collector's Guide Publishing. 2001. .
 The Collector's Guide to Heavy Metal - Volume 1: The Seventies. Burlington: Collector's Guide Publishing. 2003. .
 The Collector's Guide to Heavy Metal - Volume 2: The Eighties. Burlington: Collector's Guide Publishing. 2005. .
 The Collector's Guide to Heavy Metal - Volume 3: The Nineties. Burlington: Collector's Guide Publishing. 2007. .
 The Collector's Guide to Heavy Metal - Volume 4: The 00s (with David Perri). Burlington: Collector's Guide Publishing. 2011. .

Ye Olde Metal series
 Ye Olde Metal: 1968 to 1972. Power Chord Press. 2007. .
 Ye Olde Metal: 1973 to 1975. Power Chord Press. 2007. .
 Ye Olde Metal: 1976. Power Chord Press. 2008. .
 Ye Olde Metal: 1977. Power Chord Press. 2008. .
 Ye Olde Metal: 1978. Power Chord Press. 2009. .

Rock biographies
 Contents Under Pressure: 30 Years of Rush at Home and Away. Toronto: ECW Press. 2004. .
 UFO: Shoot Out the Lights. Los Angeles: Metal Blade Records. 2005. .
 Rainbow: English Castle Magic. Los Angeles: Metal Blade Records. 2005. ISBN B-00-13FZP6-U.
 Dio: Light Beyond the Black. Los Angeles: Metal Blade Records. 2006. .
 Black Sabbath: Doom Let Loose - An Illustrated History. Toronto: ECW Press. 2006. .
 Judas Priest: Heavy Metal Painkillers - An Illustrated History. Toronto: ECW Press. 2007. .
 Gettin' Tighter: Deep Purple '68-76. Power Chord Press. 2008. .
 Blue Öyster Cult: Secrets Revealed!. Power Chord Press. 2009. .
 A Castle Full of Rascals: Deep Purple '83-'09. Power Chord Press. 2009. .
 Time and a Word: The Yes Story. Soundcheck Books. 2016. .
 AC/DC: Album By Album. Quarto Publishing Group. 2017 .

Miscellaneous
 Goldmine Heavy Metal Price Guide. Iola: Krause Publications. 2000. .
 The Top 500 Heavy Metal Songs of All Time. Toronto: ECW Press. 2003. .
 The Top 500 Heavy Metal Albums of All Time. Toronto: ECW Press. 2004. .
 The New Wave of Heavy Metal Singles. Scrap Metal Records. 2005. .
 Run for Cover: The Art of Derek Riggs. Aardvark Publishing. 2006. .
 All Access: The Art and History of the Backstage Pass. Los Angeles: Cleopatra Records. 2009. .
 Worlds Away: Voivod and the Art of Michel Langevin. Spider Press. 2009. .

References

External links 

1963 births
Canadian music journalists
University of Victoria alumni
McMaster University alumni
Canadian people of Russian descent
Living people
People from Castlegar, British Columbia